John Marius Wilson (c. 1805–1885) was a British writer and an editor, most notable for his gazetteers. The Imperial Gazetteer of England and Wales (published 1870–72), was a substantial topographical dictionary in six volumes. It was a companion to his Imperial Gazetteer of Scotland, published 1854–57.

He was born in Lochmaben, Dumfriesshire in about 1805, and was ordained as a Congregationalist minister, working for a time in County Galway in Ireland. From the late 1840s onwards he devoted himself to writing and editing, living in Edinburgh, where he died in 1885, aged 80.

Selected works
 The Farmer's Dictionary or a cyclopedia of agriculture in all its departments, principles, methods, recent improvements and business affairs as taught and practice by the most distinguished British agriculturists of the present day.  (n.d.)
 The Rural Cyclopedia: or a general dictionary of agriculture, and of the arts, sciences, instruments, and practice, necessary to the farmer, stockfarmer, gardener, forester, landsteward, farrier, &c. (1847–49)
 The Potato, its diseases, uses, etc. (1850)
 A Memoir of Field-marshal, the Duke of Wellington; with interspersed notices of his principal associates in council, and companions and opponents in arms (1853–54)
 The Imperial Gazetteer of Scotland : or, Dictionary of Scottish topography 2 vols. (1854–57)
 Landscapes of Interesting Localities mentioned in the Holy Scriptures ... (1855)
 The Divine Architect, or The wonders of creation (1857)
 The land of Scott; or, Tourists' guide to Abbotsford, the country of the Tweed and its tributaries, and St. Mary's loch (1858)
 Earth, Sea, and Sky; or, The hand of God in the works of nature (1859)
 (1860)
 The Imperial Gazetteer of England and Wales; embracing recent changes in counties etc.; and forming a complete description of the country (1870–72)
 Nature, Man, and God: a contrib. to the scientific teaching of to-day (1885)

References 

British book editors
British non-fiction writers
19th-century British writers
Christian writers
1805 births
People from Dumfries and Galloway
1885 deaths
British encyclopedists
19th-century British male writers
Male non-fiction writers